Demidevil (stylized in all caps) is the debut mixtape by American singer-songwriter and rapper Ashnikko. It was released on January 15, 2021, through Parlophone and Warner Records. The mixtape was supported by four singles: "Cry" featuring Grimes, "Daisy", "Deal with It" featuring Kelis, and "Slumber Party" featuring Princess Nokia.

Background
Following the release of her 2019 EP, Hi It's Me, Ashnikko would return with the single "Tantrum" on March 6, 2020. Originally intended as the lead single for the mixtape, the song would later be demoted to a stand-alone single. The "DemiDevil" character was first portrayed in the "Tantrum" music video alongside Ashnikko herself and another character titled "Little Blue". The latter would later be revealed as a song title on the mixtape. Album track "Clitoris! The Musical" was first featured in the video "ASH WEDNESDAY 2020". Ashnikko first teased the mixtape in a series of videos in which she is gradually turning into her "demidevil" alter ego. The last of the three videos revealed the cover art, tracklist and release date for the mixtape. Ashnikko coincidingly, officially announced the mixtape on August 28, 2020, via her social media platforms.

Demidevil was met with several delays before its release. An initial date for October 9, 2020 was announced in August earlier that year. The mixtape then suffered its first delay in September due to "shipping delays" and other unknown reasons. The mixtape was then intended for a November 13 release. A second delay was announced in October 2020, with the mixtape having a scheduled release for February 19, 2021. In early 2021, Warner Music Group's merchandise team accidentally shipped out orders including physical copies of the mixtape earlier than its February 19th release. Following this error, Ashnikko would reveal a new date for the mixtape, January 15, 2021.

Composition
Demidevil is a pop and pop-trap album that takes influence from R&B, hip hop, pop punk, electropop, nu metal, and hyperpop.

Singles
The lead single from Demidevil, "Cry", was released on June 17, 2020, and features Canadian musician Grimes. An animated music video was premiered alongside the track's release. This video would later be nominated at the UK Music Video Awards in the category of "Best Pop Video - UK".

The opening track, "Daisy" was released as the mixtape's second single on July 9, 2020. A music video in collaboration with Beats Electronics and TikTok was released on August 7, 2020. Commercially, "Daisy" peaked at #24 on the UK Singles Chart, becoming her first charting and first top 40 hit in the United Kingdom. The song also peaked at #3 on the Billboard Bubbling Under Hot 100 chart, becoming her second entry on the chart after "Stupid".

After being teased a day before its release, "Deal with It" featuring American singer Kelis was released as the mixtape's third single on January 12, 2021. It premiered on BBC Radio 1 and its music video was released along with the song's widespread release. With less than 3 days of tracking, the single charted at #84 on the UK Singles Chart, becoming her second ever charting track in the United Kingdom.

"Slumber Party" featuring American rapper Princess Nokia was released as the fourth single on April 23, 2021, after achieving viral success on TikTok. The song would be performed on the Late Night with Seth Meyers show on April 30, 2021. A music video was released on May 13, 2021.

Critical reception

Demidevil received positive reviews from contemporary music critics. At Metacritic, a website that aggregates reviews of music albums, which assigns a normalized rating out of 100 to reviews from mainstream publications, the album received an average score of 74, based on 9 reviews, indicating "generally favorable reviews". El Hunt of NME wrote that Ashnikko's "first real body of work builds on the early hype, and draws from a far wider pot of musical influences than before: Nu-metal, pop-punk, The Neptunes-esque production tricks and campy musical theatre", and concluded that the record "shows that [she is] far more than a two-trend wonder – with a tank full of intriguing bangers that evade living under 'Daisy's formidable shadow."

Reviewing the album for AllMusic, Fred Thomas stated that "The project's ten tracks nicely mix Ashnikko's enormous personality and brazen confidence with infectious pop-trap production and hints of early-2000s nostalgia that range from subtle to overt."

Billboard included the album on their list of the best albums of the first half of 2021.

Commercial performance
Demidevil debuted at number 107 on the US Billboard 200. It also debuted at number one on the US Heatseekers Albums (Billboard). In the United Kingdom, the album debuted at number 19 on the UK Albums (OCC). Overall, the album debuted in seven countries including Canada.

Track listing

Notes
 "Deal with It" samples the song "Caught Out There" as performed by Kelis and written by The Neptunes.
 "L8r Boi" interpolates the song "Sk8er Boi" as performed by Avril Lavigne and written by Lavigne, Lauren Christy, Scott Spock and Graham Edwards.

Personnel
Credits adapted from Tidal.

Musicians

 Ashnikko – lead vocals
 Grimes – featured vocals
 Kelis – featured vocals
 Princess Nokia – featured vocals
 Marcus Andersson – acoustic guitar
 CallMeTheKidd – keyboards, programming, background vocals
 Mark Crew – keyboards, programming
 Dan Priddy – keyboards, programming
 Oscar Scheller – bass, drums, keyboards, programming, synthesizer
 Slinger – background vocals, drums, keyboards, sitar, synthesizer, santur, bells, flute, guitar, piano

Technical

 Zukye Ardella – recording engineer
 Ebenezer – programming, recording engineer
 CallMeTheKidd – mixing, recording engineer
 Chris Gehringer – mastering
 Andrew Goldstein – guitar, programming, recording engineer
 John Greenham – mastering
 Oscar Scheller – mixing
 Slinger – recording engineer
 Mark "Spike" Stent – mixing
 Matt Wolach – assistant

Charts

Certifications

References

2021 mixtape albums
Debut mixtape albums
Warner Records albums
Parlophone albums
Trap music albums
Pop albums by American artists